Erlenbach bei Marktheidenfeld (officially ) is a community in the Main-Spessart district in the Regierungsbezirk of Lower Franconia in Bavaria, Germany and a member of the  (Administrative Community) of Marktheidenfeld. It has given itself the title  – Wine Town with Heart.

Geography

Location 
The community lies on Bundesstraße 8 between Würzburg and Aschaffenburg.

Constituent communities 
Besides Erlenbach itself, the outlying centre of Tiefenthal also belongs to the community.

History 
As part of the Prince-Bishopric (Hochstift) of Würzburg, Erlenbach was in Bavaria's favour secularized in 1803 and passed under the Peace of Pressburg (1805) to Archduke Ferdinand of Tuscany to form the Grand Duchy of Würzburg, whence it passed back to Bavaria in 1814.

Population development 
Within town limits, 1,875 inhabitants were counted in 1970, 2,074 in 1987 and in 2000 2,347.

Politics 
The mayor is Georg Neubauer (FWG-SPD).
 
Municipal taxes in 1999 amounted to €1,078,000 (converted), of which net business taxes amounted to €132,000.

Community council 
Seat apportionment after municipal election in 2008:
 CSU: 5
 FWG-SPD: 6
 Bürgergemeinschaft Tiefenthal: 3

Coat of arms 
The community's arms might be described thus: Gules two arrows in saltire the dexters sable and the sinisters Or surmounted by a heart argent, itself surmounted by a bunch of grapes azure, the stalk of the second, the whole between two mullets of six of the third.

The arms are based on the village's 18th-century seal, which bore the same charges seen today in the arms, likewise marshalled. The grapes stand for the community's wine-growing, and the heart may refer to the love of community. The arrows stand for the defence of the village, and the six-pointed stars come from the Wertheim family's roses. The tinctures come from the arms borne by the Princely Electorate of Würzburg, to which Erlenbach belonged from 1612 to 1803.

Culture and sightseeing 
 There is a woodland adventure path.
 Events:  (“Wine Hiking Day”) yearly in May on Ascension Day (Sport Club), Wine Festival yearly in June (Wine-growing Club), May Forest Festival,  as well as many other events by various local clubs during  (Carnival), Lens Grinders’ Street Festival, Music and Singing Club's Street Festival (Corpus Christi), Erlenbach Fire Brigade's Strong Beer Festival, and more.

Museums 
 In the Town Hall yard is a village museum.

Buildings 
Saint Burkhard's Parish Church was built by Julius Echter in 1613.

Famous people

Sons and daughters of the town 
 Hans Martin (b. 26 January 1916; d. 27 November 2007 in Würzburg), composer, choir leader, organist and teacher

References

External links 

 Community’s official webpage 
 Verwaltungsgemeinschaft of Marktheidenfeld  

Main-Spessart